Prilutskaya is a rural locality (a village) in Ust-Velskoye Rural Settlement of Velsky District, Arkhangelsk Oblast, Russia. The population was 331 as of 2014. There are 4 streets.

Geography 
Prilutskaya is located on the Vel River, 9 km west of Velsk (the district's administrative centre) by road. Silyutinsky is the nearest rural locality.

References 

Rural localities in Velsky District